Euryomyrtus patrickiae is a shrub endemic to Western Australia.

It is found on rises in the Mid West and Goldfields-Esperance regions of Western Australia where it grows in stony loam and sandy soils.

References

Eudicots of Western Australia
patrickiae
Endemic flora of Western Australia
Plants described in 2001
Taxa named by Malcolm Eric Trudgen